The JY15 is an American one-design centerboard dinghy designed by Rod Johnstone in 1989.

Production
The design was initially built by Hunter Marine in the United States, but that company ceased production. The design was acquired by Nickels Boats Works and built from 2011. Nickels merged with WindRider LLC of Minneapolis, Minnesota in 2015 and production continued, but had ended by 2020.

Design
The JY15 is a recreational, planing hull, sailing dinghy, built predominantly of Advanced Composite Process (ACP) by Hunter and later from fiberglass by Nickels and WindRider. It has a fractional sloop, a raked stem, a vertical transom, a transom-hung rudder controlled by a  tiller with an extension and a folding centerboard. It displaces .

The stays have lever adjusters for rapid set-up and the mast disassembles for ease of ground transport. The mainsheet is a 2:1 and is led off to the centerboard trunk. The rudder swings up for launching and recovering in shallow water. The design is optimized for crew hiking out, with hiking straps and rounded deck and hull for comfort.

The Hunter-production JY-15 was made out of ACP (Advanced Composite Process). ACP is a laminate consisting of a foam core, an inner fiberglass skin, and a 1/8" outer plastic skin. When the design was acquired by Nickels it was rendered in fiberglass.

Operational history
The JY15 is sailed in over 80 fleets in the US.

See also
List of sailing boat types

Similar sailboats
Laser 2

References

External links
Official website archive on Archive.org
Official Hunter Marine brochure

Dinghies
1980s sailboat type designs
Sailboat type designs by Rod Johnstone
Sailboat types built by Hunter Marine
Sailboat types built by Nickels Boat Works
Sailboat types built by WindRider LLC